"Feelin' Good" is a song by Faithless, from their sixth studio album The Dance (2010). The song was released in the United Kingdom as a digital download on 29 August 2010. The song features Rollo's sister Dido on vocals. The song peaked at number 125 on the UK Singles Chart.

Track listing

Chart performance

Release history

References

2010 singles
2010 songs
Faithless songs
Dido (singer) songs
Songs written by Rollo Armstrong
Songs written by Dido (singer)
Songs written by Maxi Jazz